Sinak (also Romanized as Sīnak) is a village in Taraznahid Rural District, in the Central District of Saveh County, Markazi Province, Iran. At the 2006 census, its population was 101, in 21 families.

References 

Populated places in Saveh County